Enzo Bianco (born 24 February 1951) is an Italian politician, former mayor of Catania and former Minister of the Interior.

Early life
Bianco was born on 24 February 1951 in Aidone, province of Enna, Italy.

Career
Bianco has been a member of the Chamber of Deputies from 1992 to 1993 with the Italian Republican Party and from 2001 to 2006 with The Olive Tree. He has then been Senator from 2006 to 2013 with the Democratic Party.

Bianco has been Minister of interior from 1999 to 2001 in the D'Alema II Cabinet and in the Amato II Cabinet.

He has been for a short period Mayor of Catania from 1988 to 1989 and has been re-elected in 1993, becoming the first mayor elected directly by the citizens of Catania, and in 1997, leaving the office in order to assume the charge of Minister of interior.
After failing to be re-elected mayor in 2005, he manages to be re-elected in 2013, holding the charge for 5 more years. At the 2018 communal elections, he is defeated by the Forza Italia candidate Salvo Pogliese.

References

External links

 Enzo Bianco at Italian Senate, XIII Legislature
 Enzo Bianco at Italian Senate, XIV Legislature
 Enzo Bianco at Italian Senate, XV Legislature
 Enzo Bianco at Italian Senate, XVI Legislature
 Enzo Bianco at Radio Radicale

1951 births
Living people
People from Aidone
Italian Republican Party politicians
Democratic Alliance (Italy) politicians
The Democrats (Italy) politicians
Democracy is Freedom – The Daisy politicians
Democratic Party (Italy) politicians
Italian Ministers of the Interior
Deputies of Legislature XI of Italy
Deputies of Legislature XIV of Italy
Senators of Legislature XV of Italy
Senators of Legislature XVI of Italy
Mayors of Catania